Third party liability may refer to:

 Vicarious liability, a legal doctrine 
 Third-party liability in insurance